Giuseppe Zais (March 22, 1709 – October 29, 1784) was an Italian painter of landscapes (vedutisti) who painted mostly in Venice. He was born in Forno di Canale.

He was influenced in his vedute by Marco Ricci and later Francesco Zuccarelli, who helped train him. He is best known for frescoes in Villa Pisani in Stra. While he had been a member of the Academy of Painters in Venice from 1774, he died in poverty at Treviso.

Sources
 

1709 births
1784 deaths
People from Canale d'Agordo
18th-century Italian painters
Italian male painters
Italian vedutisti
Painters from Venice
18th-century Italian male artists